The Norway national beach soccer team represents Norway in international beach soccer competitions and is controlled by the NFF, the governing body for football in Norway.

Current squad
''Correct as of July 2012:

Coach: Rune Kandal

Participations
 ESBL Preliminary Event, Athens, Greece: 2007
 Challenge Cup, Netanya, Israel: 2008
 BSWW Euro League Stage 2, Tignes (French Alps), France: 2008

External links
 BSWW Euroleague 2008 Home Page

References

European national beach soccer teams
Beach soccer